Jask Airport  is an airport near Jask, Hormozgan, Iran.

Airlines and destinations

References

Airports in Iran
Hormozgan Province
Jask County
Buildings and structures in Hormozgan Province
Transportation in Hormozgan Province